The Culebra skink (Spondylurus culebrae) is a species of skink found on Culebra and on Culebrita, an uninhabited island off Culebra, in Puerto Rico.

References

Spondylurus
Reptiles described in 2012
Reptiles of the Caribbean
Endemic fauna of the Caribbean
Taxa named by Stephen Blair Hedges
Taxa named by Caitlin E. Conn